The 1932 Home Nations Championship was the twenty-eighth series of the rugby union Home Nations Championship. Including the previous incarnations as the Five Nations, and prior to that, the Home Nations, this was the forty-fifth series of the northern hemisphere rugby union championship. Six matches were played between 16 January and 19 March. It was contested by England, Ireland, Scotland and Wales. Following the 1931 Five Nations series, France had been expelled from the championship for alleged professionalism and administrative deficiencies (they would remain expelled until 1939).

Table

Results

External links

1932
Home Nations
Home Nations
Home Nations
Home Nations
Home Nations
Home Nations Championship
Home Nations Championship
Home Nations Championship